The Journal of Technology Law & Policy is a law review devoted to discussion and analysis of the legal implications of technology. Topics include, but are not limited to patents, copyrights, trademarks, trade secrets, antitrust, information privacy, and computer law. The journal was established in 1995 and is published twice yearly by the University of Florida Levin College of Law.

University of Florida
American law journals
Technology law journals
Publications established in 1995
1995 establishments in Florida